The 47th Japan National University Rugby Championship (2010/2011).

Qualifying Teams
Kanto League A (Taiko)
 Waseda, Keio University, Meiji, Teikyo University, University of Tsukuba

Kanto League B
 Tokai University, Ryutsu Keizai University, Kanto Gakuin University, Chuo University, Daito Bunka University

Kansai League
 Tenri University, Kwansei Gakuin, Kinki University, Osaka University of Health and Sport Sciences, Kyoto Sangyo University

Kyushu League
 Fukuoka University

Knockout stage

Final

Universities Competing
 Waseda
 Keio University
 Meiji
 Teikyo University
 University of Tsukuba
 Tokai University
 Ryutsu Keizai University
 Kanto Gakuin University
 Chuo University
 Daito Bunka University
 Tenri University
 Kwansei Gakuin
 Kinki University
 Osaka University of Health and Sport Sciences
 Kyoto Sangyo University

External links
 The 47th Japan University Rugby Championship - JRFU Official Page (Japanese)
 Rugby union in Japan

All-Japan University Rugby Championship
Univ
Japan Univ